Environmental Justice in South Korea has a relatively short history compared to other countries in the west. As a result of rapid industrialization, people started to have awareness on pollution, and from the environmental discourses the idea of environmental justice appeared in late 1980s.

South Korea experienced rapid economic growth (which is commonly referred to as the 'Miracle on the Han River') in the 20th century as a result of industrialization policies adapted by Park Chung-hee after 1970s. The policies and social environment had no room for environmental discussions, which aggravated the pollution in the country.

Environmental movements in South Korea started from air pollution campaigns. As the notion of environment pollution spread, the focus on environmental activism shifted from existing pollution to preventing future pollution, and the organizations eventually started to criticize the government policies that are neglecting the environmental issues. The concept of environmental justice was introduced in South Korea among the discussions of environment after 1990s. While the environmental organizations analyzed the condition of pollution in South Korea, they noticed that the environmental problems were inequitably focused especially on regions where people with low social and economic status were concentrated.

The problems of environmental injustice have arisen by environment related organizations, but approaches to solve the problems were greatly supported by the government, which developed various policies and launched institution. These actions helped raise awareness of environmental justice in South Korea. Existing environment policies were modified to cover environmental justice issues.

Environmental justice began to be widely recognized in the 1990s through policy making and researches of related institutions. For example, the Ministry of Environment, which was founded in 1992, launched Citizen's Movement for Environmental Justice (CMEJ) to raise awareness of the problem and figure out appropriate plans. As a part of its activities, Citizen's Movement for Environmental Justice (CMEJ) held Environmental Justice forum in 1999, to gather and analyze the existing studies on the issue which were done sporadically by various organizations. CMEJ started as a small organization, but it is expanding. In 2002, CMEJ had more than five times the numbers of members and three times the budget it had in the beginning year.

Environmental injustice is still an ongoing problem. One example is the construction of Saemangeum Seawall. The construction of Saemangeum Seawall, which is the world's longest dyke (33 kilometers) runs between Yellow Sea and Saemangeum estuary, was part of a government project initiated in 1991. The project raised concerns on the destruction of ecosystem and taking away the local residential regions. It caught the attention of environmental justice activists because the main victims were low-income fishing population and their future generations. This is considered as an example of environmental injustice which was caused by the execution of exclusive development-centered policy.

The construction of Seoul-Incheon canal also raised environmental justice controversies. The construction took away the residential regions and farming areas of the local residents. Also, the environment worsened in the area because of the appearance of wet fogs which was caused by water deprivation and local climate changes caused by the construction of canal. The local residents, mostly people with weak economic basis, were severely affected by the construction and became the main victims of such environmental damages. While the socially and economically weak citizens suffered from the environmental changes, most of the benefits went to the industries and conglomerates with political power.

Construction of industrial complex was also criticized in the context of environmental justice. The conflict in Wicheon region is one example. The region became the center of controversy when the government decided to build industrial complex of dye houses, which were formerly located in Daegu metropolitan region. As a result of the construction, Nakdong River, which is one of the main rivers in South Korea, was contaminated and local residents suffered from environmental changes caused by the construction.

Environmental justice is a growing issue in South Korea. Although the issue is not yet widely recognized compared to other countries, many organizations beginning to recognize the issue.

References 

Environmental justice